The Men's 100 metre breaststroke competition at the 2017 World Championships was held on 23 and 24 July 2017.

Records
Prior to the competition, the existing world and championship records were as follows.

The following new records were set during this competition.

Results

Heats
The heats were held on 23 July at 11:17.

Semifinals
The semifinals were held on 23 July at 18:21.

Semifinal 1

Semifinal 2

Final
The final was held on 24 July at 17:32.

References

Men's 100 metre breaststroke